Michael Emenalo (born 14 July 1965)  is a Nigerian former professional footballer who played as a left-back. He is the former director of football of Chelsea F.C and AS Monaco FC.

Playing career
Emenalo began his career in his native Nigeria before moving to the United States, where he attended college at and played for Boston University, from 1985 to 1988. He played for Molenbeek in Belgium, Eintracht Trier in Germany, and Notts County F.C in England before going back to the US. Emenalo was part of the original allocated players for Major League Soccer and spent two seasons (1996–97) with the San Jose Clash. After that, he played with UE Lleida in Spain and Maccabi Tel Aviv in Israel.

Emenalo won 14 caps for Nigeria and played in the 1994 FIFA World Cup, missing the first game through injury but then, played against Argentina and Greece before Nigeria was knocked out by Italy.

Technical director
Emenalo became director of player development at the Tucson Soccer Academy in the US in 2006, before joining the coaching staff at Chelsea when former manager Avram Grant was in charge in 2007. After the departure of Ray Wilkins, Emenalo was promoted from his position as chief scout to assistant first team coach on 18 November 2010. On 8 July 2011, Chelsea appointed Emenalo as Technical Director of the club. He completely restructured the club's academy, scouting, loan and women's team setups, and is credited as a key figure behind the club's success having overseen the scouting and  transfers of key players including Juan Mata, Thibaut Courtois, Kevin De Bruyne, Mohamed Salah, N'Golo Kanté, Eden Hazard, and Cesc Fàbregas. He has been credited by numerous sources as being the driving force behind Chelsea's most influential signings. He has also been credited for the development of the Chelsea Football Club Academy (CFC Academy) as well as the recent resurgence of the Chelsea Football Club Women’s Team.

On 10 June 2013, Emenalo requested that his contract be terminated "to facilitate the return of José Mourinho". but his request was denied.

On 6 November 2017, he resigned as technical director of the club, and at the end of that month joined Monaco as its sporting director. On 12 August 2019, Emenalo left Monaco by mutual consent.

Honours 
Chelsea
 Premier League: 2009–10, 2014–15, 2016–17
 FA Cup: 2008–09, 2009–10, 2011–12, 2017–18
 Football League Cup / EFL Cup: 2014–15
 UEFA Champions League: 2011–12
 UEFA Europa League: 2012–13

References

External links

https://www.theguardian.com/football/2020/jul/19/michael-emenalo-the-narrative-that-white-is-good-has-to-change

1965 births
Living people
Nigerian footballers
People from Aba, Abia
Boston University alumni
Rangers International F.C. players
R.W.D.M. Brussels F.C. players
R.W.D. Molenbeek players
Boston University Terriers men's soccer players
Notts County F.C. players
San Jose Earthquakes players
Maccabi Tel Aviv F.C. players
UE Lleida players
La Liga players
Major League Soccer players
Israeli Premier League players
1994 FIFA World Cup players
1995 King Fahd Cup players
Nigeria international footballers
Expatriate footballers in Belgium
Expatriate soccer players in the United States
Expatriate footballers in Germany
Expatriate footballers in England
Expatriate footballers in Spain
Expatriate footballers in Israel
Nigerian expatriate sportspeople in Belgium
Nigerian expatriate sportspeople in the United States
Nigerian expatriate sportspeople in Germany
Nigerian expatriate sportspeople in England
Nigerian expatriate sportspeople in Spain
Nigerian expatriate sportspeople in Israel
Chelsea F.C. non-playing staff
Association football defenders
AS Monaco FC non-playing staff